The title of University Professor at the University of California is "reserved for scholars of international distinction who are recognized and respected as teachers of exceptional ability .  Unlike Distinguished Professorships, which are campus specific, recommendations for the appointment of a University Professor at the University of California are made by the President of the University of California, and all such appointments must be confirmed by the Regents of the University of California. Since 1960, there have been 38 faculty given the title of University Professor.

See also
Distinguished Professor

External links
UC policy page on University Professor

University of California